Karen Kafadar is an American statistician. She is Commonwealth Professor of Statistics at the University of Virginia, and chair of the statistics department there. She was editor-in-chief of Technometrics from 1999 to 2001, and was president of the International Association for Statistical Computing for 2011–2013.
In 2017 she was elected president of the American Statistical Association for the 2019 term.

Education and career
Kafadar earned a bachelor's degree in mathematics and a master's degree in statistics from Stanford University, both in 1975.
She completed her PhD in statistics from Princeton University in 1979 under the supervision of John Tukey; her dissertation was Robust Confidence Intervals for the One- and Two- Sample Problem.
Before moving to the University of Virginia in 2014, Kafadar was Rudy Professor of Statistics at Indiana University. She has also worked for the National Institute of Standards and Technology, Hewlett Packard, the National Cancer Institute, the University of Colorado Denver, and Oregon State University.

Awards and honors
Kafadar is a fellow of the American Statistical Association (since 1994) and the American Association for the Advancement of Science (2012), and an elected member of the International Statistical Institute (2007).

References

Year of birth missing (living people)
Living people
American women statisticians
Stanford University alumni
Princeton University alumni
Oregon State University faculty
University of Colorado Denver faculty
Indiana University faculty
University of Virginia faculty
Presidents of the American Statistical Association
Elected Members of the International Statistical Institute
Fellows of the American Association for the Advancement of Science
Fellows of the American Statistical Association
21st-century American women
Place of birth missing (living people)